Kevin McKeown (born 12 October 1967) is a Scottish retired footballer, who played as a goalkeeper. He played for Motherwell, Stenhousemuir, and Stirling in Scotland before moving to the Irish League with Crusaders. In 1994–95 he was named as the Ulster Footballer of the Year. McKeown subsequently played for Ayr United, Newry Town, Coleraine, Cliftonville, Brechin City, and East Fife.

Honours
Crusaders
Irish League (2): 1994–95, 1996–97
Irish League Cup (1): 1996–97
County Antrim Shield (1): 1991/92
Ulster Cup (1): 1993/94

Individual
Ulster Footballer of the Year (1): 1994–95
NI Football Writers' Association Player of the Year (1): 1994–95
NI PFA Player of the Year (1): 1994–95

References

External links 

.

1967 births
Living people
Footballers from Glasgow
Scottish footballers
Association football goalkeepers
Motherwell F.C. players
Stenhousemuir F.C. players
Stirling Albion F.C. players
Crusaders F.C. players
Ayr United F.C. players
Newry City F.C. players
Coleraine F.C. players
Cliftonville F.C. players
Brechin City F.C. players
East Fife F.C. players
Ulster Footballers of the Year
Northern Ireland Football Writers' Association Players of the Year
NIFL Premiership players
Linlithgow Rose F.C. players